Lefevrea megacephala is a species of leaf beetle of the Democratic Republic of the Congo. It was first described by the Belgian entomologist  in 1940.

References 

Eumolpinae
Beetles of the Democratic Republic of the Congo
Beetles described in 1940
Endemic fauna of the Democratic Republic of the Congo